Li Dongna (born 6 December 1988) is a Chinese footballer who currently plays for Dalian in the Chinese Women's Super League. She is also the current captain of the Chinese women's national team.

Honours

Club
Tianjin Huisen
Chinese Women's Super League: 2007

International
China PR national football team
Four Nations Tournament: 2009, 2014, 2016

International goals

References

External links 
 
 Official page

1988 births
Living people
Chinese expatriate footballers
China women's international footballers
2015 FIFA Women's World Cup players
Footballers at the 2016 Summer Olympics
Chinese expatriate sportspeople in South Korea
Chinese women's footballers
Expatriate women's footballers in South Korea
Footballers from Dalian
Suwon FC Women players
WK League players
Women's association football midfielders
Footballers at the 2014 Asian Games
Olympic footballers of China
Dalian Quanjian F.C. players
Chinese Women's Super League players
Universiade gold medalists for China
Universiade medalists in football
Asian Games competitors for China
2007 FIFA Women's World Cup players
Medalists at the 2011 Summer Universiade